Whitewater is a town in Franklin Township, Wayne County, in the U.S. state of Indiana. The population was 83 at the 2010 census.

History
Whitewater was originally called Hillsborough, and under the latter name was laid out and platted in 1828. The community was named after the nearby Whitewater River.

The first post office in Whitewater was established in 1832.

Geography
Whitewater is located at  (39.943503, -84.830332).

Demographics

2010 census
As of the census of 2010, there were 83 people, 35 households, and 27 families living in the town. The racial makeup of the town was 100.0% White.

There were 35 households, of which 28.6% had children under the age of 18 living with them, 54.3% were married couples living together, 11.4% had a female householder with no husband present, 11.4% had a male householder with no wife present, and 22.9% were non-families. 14.3% of all households were made up of individuals, and 5.7% had someone living alone who was 65 years of age or older. The average household size was 2.37 and the average family size was 2.63.

The median age in the town was 38.5 years. 25.3% of residents were under the age of 18; 3.5% were between the ages of 18 and 24; 25.2% were from 25 to 44; 26.4% were from 45 to 64; and 19.3% were 65 years of age or older. The gender makeup of the town was 55.4% male and 44.6% female.

2000 census
As of the census of 2000, there were 78 people, 28 households, and 25 families living in the town. The racial makeup of the town was 100.00% White.

There were 28 households, out of which 32.1% had children under the age of 18 living with them, 75.0% were married couples living together, 7.1% had a female householder with no husband present, and 10.7% were non-families. 7.1% of all households were made up of individuals, and 7.1% had someone living alone who was 65 years of age or older. The average household size was 2.79, and the average family size was 2.84.

In the town, the population was spread out, with 28.2% under the age of 18, 5.1% from 18 to 24, 25.6% from 25 to 44, 23.1% from 45 to 64, and 17.9% who were 65 years of age or older. The median age was 40 years. For every 100 females, there were 122.9 males. For every 100 females age 18 and over, there were 100.0 males.

The median income for a household in the town was $31,875, and the median income for a family was $33,125. Males had a median income of $43,250 versus $26,250 for females. The per capita income for the town was $13,987. There were 9.5% of families and 6.7% of the population living below the poverty line, including no under eighteens and none of those over 64.

References

Towns in Wayne County, Indiana
Towns in Indiana